Ray Cooper, also known as Chopper, is an English/Scottish singer-songwriter and multi-instrumentalist living in Sweden.

Initial musical collaborations and session work

Cooper's first professional band (1975–1978) was Amazorblades together with Rob Keyloch (engineer/producer/remixer) and Ben Mandelson. They were a punk/jazz outfit who toured extensively and recorded the single 'Common Truth' in 1977 for Chiswick Records. 

Between 1981 and 1982 Cooper played with the London based band OK Jive, who signed to CBS in 1981. In 1983, he played bass guitar and bugle with The Mighty Clouds of Dust on their single release Flowers on the Wall / Champion (The Wonder Horse) / Mr.Custer.

In 1983, Cooper joined the World Music group 3 Mustaphas 3 where he played cello and sang under the name of Oussack Mustapha, alias The Nightingale of Szegerely. He recorded two albums with them for Globe Style Records. They also recorded a single with Agnes Bernelle produced by Phil Chevron and Elvis Costello. Cooper left the group in 1986. He performed in a reunion of six group members at the 30th Anniversary concert for fRoots magazine at the Roundhouse in London on 22 January 2010.

Member of Oysterband

Cooper was a member of Oysterband between 1989 and 2013.

Discography

With Amazorblades 
 Common Truth (Single) 1977

With Yachts 
 Without Radar (1980)

With OK Jive 
 To You 1982 (Single produced by Rob Keyloch)
 On Route 1982 (Single produced by Joe Jackson)

The Mighty Clouds of Dust 
 Flowers on the Wall / Champion (The Wonder Horse) / Mr.Custer 1983 (Single produced by Phil Chevron)

With 3 Mustaphas 3 
 Bam! Mustaphas Play Stereo, 1985
 From the Balkans to Your Heart: The Radio Years, 1986

With Oysterband 
As Oyster Band
 Ride (1989)
 Freedom and Rain (1990) (collaboration with June Tabor)

As Oysterband
 Deserters (1992)
 Holy Bandits (1993)
 Trawler (1994)
 The Shouting End of Life (1995)
 Deep Dark Ocean (1997)
 Here I Stand (1999)
 Rise Above (2002)
 25 (2003)
 Meet You There (2007)
 The Oxford Girl and Other Stories (2008)
 Ragged Kingdom (2011) (collaboration with June Tabor)

Live albums
 Little Rock to Leipzig (1990) (partially live)
 Alive and Shouting (1996)
 Alive and Acoustic (1998)
 25th Anniversary Concert (2004) DVD 
 Northern Light (2006)

'Compilation albums
 The Rough Guide to World Music (1994) (contributing the track "When I'm Up I Can't Get Down")
 The Rough Guide to English Roots Music (1998) (contributing the track "Sail on By")
 Pearls from the Oysters (1998) (taking tracks from Step Outside, Wide Blue Yonder, Ride and Little Rock to Leipzig)
 This House Will Stand (The Best of Oysterband 1998–2015) (2016), double album containing alternate versions and demos

Solo 
 'Tales of Love War and Death by Hanging' (2010) CD
 'Palace of Tears' (2014) CD
 'Between The Golden Age & The Promised Land'  (2018) CD and LP
 'Land of Heroes' (2021) CD and LP

Other published material 
 'Ray Cooper Songs' (2015) song book

Awards  
 2003 Good Tradition Award, BBC Radio 2 Folk Awards (with Oysterband)
 2005 Best Group, Oysterband Big Session, BBC Radio 2 Folk Awards
 2009 Best group, Spiral Earth Award (with Oysterband)
 2012 Best album, Spiral Earth Award (with June Tabor & Oysterband)
 2012 Best Traditional Track, BBC Radio 2 Folk Awards (with June Tabor & Oysterband)
 2012 Best Album, BBC Radio 2 Folk Awards (with June Tabor & Oysterband)
 2012 Best Group, BBC Radio 2 Folk Awards (with June Tabor & Oysterband)

References

External links 
 Official Website
 Ray Cooper Discogs entry 
 Ray Cooper on AllMusic

1954 births
Living people
English male singer-songwriters
English folk singers
People educated at Charterhouse School
Alumni of the University of Brighton
Oysterband members